Masłowice may refer to the following places:
Masłowice, Radomsko County in Łódź Voivodeship (central Poland)
Masłowice, Wieluń County in Łódź Voivodeship (central Poland)
Masłowice, West Pomeranian Voivodeship (north-west Poland)